The American Bar Foundation (ABF) is an independent, nonprofit national research institute established in 1952 and located in Chicago. Its mission is to expand knowledge and advance justice by supporting innovative, interdisciplinary and rigorous empirical research on law, legal processes and legal institutions. This program of sociolegal research is conducted by an interdisciplinary staff of Research Faculty trained in such diverse fields as law, sociology, psychology, political science, economics, history, and anthropology.

The American Bar Foundation is located in the same building as Northwestern University Pritzker School of Law in downtown Chicago.

The American Bar Foundation supports faculty research and scholarly activity that results in books, reports and essays. The American Bar Foundation Research Faculty produce Law and Social Inquiry (LSI), a peer-reviewed academic journal that publishes articles, symposia, and review essays examining pressing sociolegal issues. Law and Social Inquiry is published by Cambridge University Press (previously Wiley-Blackwell). The American Bar Foundation publishes  Researching Law, a quarterly newsletter.

The American Bar Foundation is a resource for lawyers, scholars, and policy makers who seek analyses of the theory and functioning of law, legal institutions, and the legal profession. The American Bar Foundation's work is supported by the American Bar Endowment (ABE), by The Fellows of the American Bar Foundation, and by grants for particular research projects from private foundations and government agencies.

Research programs 
The American Bar Foundation's research is organized under three categories:

 Learning and practicing law
 Protecting rights and accessing justice
 Making and implementing Law

Research at the American Bar Foundation is implemented through projects designed and conducted by a group of resident Research Faculty. These projects are undertaken following review by an external review body (The Wheeler Committee) and the American Bar Foundation Board of Directors.

The American Bar Foundation disseminates its research findings to the organized bar, scholars, and the public. The results of this research are published in academic journals, law reviews, and academic and commercial presses.

Research projects conducted at the American Bar Foundation cover issues related to civil justice, criminal justice, law and globalization, legal history, diversity and law, legal education and the legal profession, and social justice. Current projects include:

Access to Justice: This project is intended to bridge the gap between the accessibility of civil legal services and the widespread civil justice problems many Americans. Findings from this significant research have provided knowledge about how civil justice issues impact different communities and how to make civil legal aid more accessible to the people who need it.
 Criminal Defense in China: This project was funded by the National Science Foundation and explores the development of criminal procedure law and practice in China, specifically revealing the Chinese government's increasing disregard for the rule of law and human rights. Principal findings from this research were published in the 2016 book Criminal Defense in China: The Politics of Lawyers at Work by ABF Research Professor Terence Halliday and ABF Faculty Fellow and Assistant Professor of Sociology and Law at the University of Toronto, Sida Liu. Criminal Defense in China was reviewed in the August 2017 issue of The New York Review of Books. 
 After the JD: This project follows a large national sample of lawyers admitted to the bar in 2000 over the first decade and more of their careers and is a source of information on the changing nature of legal careers.
Surrogate De cision-making at the End of Life: An Observational Study: This project investigates the most significant "life-and-death" decisions made by others who act on behalf of those who are not competent to make their own medical decisions. The study involves the interaction of patient families with health care providers, day after day, in two demographically diverse intensive care units in a large urban teaching hospital. Systematic data has been gathered on patient medical histories, the medical issues and decisions they face, and the interventions made on their behalf. Data on more than one thousand encounters and family meetings between almost 300 health care providers and more than 600 friends, family and significant others of 205 patients without decision-making capacity has been collected.
 Future of Latinos in the United States: Law, Opportunity and Mobility: A nation-wide, interdisciplinary research initiative devoted to understanding the current condition of Latinos in the United States, the structural barriers that prevent full equality and integration for this emerging population, and the sites of intervention that promise to be the most impactful in promoting opportunity and mobility through law and policy. The project's mission is to ensure that the Latino population flourishes by generating findings that can be converted into concrete recommendations for reform.

Publications 
The American Bar Foundation publishes news and press releases related to the publication of its faculty's research and opinions in academic journals, law reviews and major newspapers or magazines. American Bar Foundation Research Faculty have been mentioned and featured or published opinion editorials in media outlets such as The New York Times, The Washington Post, the American Bar Association Journal and others.

The American Bar Foundation publishes an Annual Report detailing the American Bar Foundation's accomplishments, including the seminars organized and other events held and attended by the American Bar Foundation, the real-world impact of its faculty's research, and publications produced.

Journals, newsletters and reports 
Other publications related to the American Bar Foundation include:

 After the JD, a national study and in-depth portrait of almost 5,000 law graduates.
 Researching Law, a quarterly newsletter designed to acquaint a wide audience with the research activities of the American Bar Foundation. The articles that appear in this publication present the findings of American Bar Foundation projects into a concise, nontechnical format to convey the full flavor of the research reported on. Topics covered have included a history of the American Bar Foundation's undergraduate research diversity program, a profile of the American Bar Foundation's first scholar of Native American legal systems, and in-depth reviews of two books published by American Bar Foundation scholars: Rights on Trial: How Workplace Discrimination Law Perpetuates Inequality and The Sit-Ins: Protest and Legal Change in the Civil Rights Era. The newsletter is distributed to a wide audience, including the Fellows of the American Bar Foundation, policy makers, libraries, foundations, government agencies, and media outlets.
 Law and Social Inquiry (LSI)], a quarterly, interdisciplinary, peer reviewed scholarly journal of international standing in law and the social sciences. Contributors include law and sociology professors, social scientists, and lawyers. LSI examines criminology, economics, history, law, philosophy, political science, sociology and social psychology. Recent LSI articles have been awarded numerous distinctions, among them the prestigious Law & Society Association Article Prize. LSI regularly features symposia, or a series of manuscripts centered on a specific sociolegal theme. In addition to its high quality of original research, LSI is widely known for its review essays. Review essays are article-length treatments of a book or group of books that situate them within their greater intellectual context and engage with relevant discourse, focusing on the bigger questions the books evoke. Each issue of the journal also includes "book notes" that present brief descriptions of twenty or thirty recently published books of interest to those working in the field of law or the social sciences. LSI also holds an annual student paper competition for graduate and law students, which includes a monetary prize and publication of the winning paper. LSIs mission is to publish the best sociolegal scholarship from around the world. American Bar Foundation scholars play a critical role in achieving this goal through their service as editors and peer reviewers of the magazine, as well as authors published in the magazine. The American Bar Foundation partnered with Cambridge University Press to begin publishing LSI in January 2019. The journal was formerly published by Wiley-Blackwell.

Books 
Books published by American Bar Foundation Research Faculty in recent years include:

 How To Save A Constitutional Democracy
 The Sit-Ins: Protest and Legal Change in the Civil Rights Era
 Global Lawmakers: International Organizations in the Crafting of World Markets
 Rights on Trial: How Workplace Discrimination Law Perpetuates Inequality
The New Legal Realism: Studying Law Globally
 The Truth about Crime: Sovereignty, Knowledge, Social Order
 Criminal Defense in China: The Politics of Lawyers at Work
 Translating the Social World for Law
 Assessing Constitutional Performance
 Las multiples dimensions del juicio por jurados
 Diversity in Practice: Race, Gender and Class in Legal and Professional Careers
 The New Legal Realism: Translating Law and Society for Today's Legal Practice
 Transnational Legal Orders

Fellowships 
The American Bar Foundation sponsors several fellowship programs.

The American Bar Foundation partners with foundations and universities to fund its fellowships, including AccessLex Institute, Northwestern University, and the University of Chicago. All fellowships are held in-residence at the American Bar Foundation's offices in Chicago.

In 2018, the American Bar Foundation celebrated the 30th anniversary of its Undergraduate Research Diversity Program with a special dinner at the Drake Hotel in Chicago.

Leadership 
The American Bar Foundation's current Interim Executive Director is Bryant Garth. 

Former directors of the American Bar Foundation include Spencer L. Kimball (a former professor of law at the University of Chicago and former dean of the University of Wisconsin Law School), John P. Heinz (now professor emeritus at the American Bar Foundation and a professor at Northwestern University Pritzker School of Law), William "Bill" Felstiner, Bryant Garth (now an affiliated research professor at the American Bar Foundation and professor of law at the University of California at Irvine), and Robert Nelson (now an American Bar Foundation research professor, the American Bar Foundation's MacCrate Research Chair in the Legal Profession, and a professor in the Department of Sociology at Northwestern University), and Ajay Mehrotra. Mehrotra became Executive Director in 2015. He is a member of the American Bar Foundation Research Faculty and a professor of law at Northwestern University Pritzker School of Law.

The American Bar Foundation is governed by a board of directors that includes David S. Houghton (a business and trial lawyer for Houghton Bradford Whitted P.C. in Omaha, NE) as President; E. Thomas Sullivan (President of the University of Vermont) as Vice-President; Walter L. Sutton, Jr. (a retired corporate attorney and diversity and inclusion consultant at Sutton Consulting Services) as Treasurer; and Jimmy K. Goodman (an attorney at Crowe & Dunlevy) as Secretary.

The American Bar Foundation has a Fellows Officers group, a Fellows Research Advisory Committee and an External Research Review Panel (also known as The Wheeler Committee).

Notable Scholars

Rebecca Sandefur
Tom Ginsburg
 Terence Halliday
Christopher Schmidt
 James Heckman
 Bonnie Honig
 Austan Goolsbee
 Elizabeth Mertz
 Laura Beth Nielsen
 Robert L. Nelson
 Carol Heimer
Robert J. Sampson
 Stephen Engel
Steven Levitt

References

External links
 The American Bar Foundation
 American Bar Endowment
 Fellows of the American Bar Foundation
Law and Social Inquiry

Organizations established in 1952
Legal organizations in Chicago
Foundations based in the United States
Non-profit organizations based in Chicago
Legal research institutes
1952 establishments in the United States